Holzgraben may refer to:

 Holzgraben (Fulda), a river of Hesse, Germany, tributary of the Fulda
 Holzgraben (Altmühl), a river of Bavaria, Germany, tributary of the Altmühl